Travis Alabanza (born 15 November 1995) is a British performance artist, writer and theatre maker.

Career 
Alabanza's poems were first published in 2015, in the Black and Gay in the UK Anthology. Later that year Alabanza went on tour for their theatre show Stories of a Queer Brown Muddy Kid, performing at clubs, bookstores, and performance venues across the United Kingdom and abroad. They have been featured as a guest lecturer and panelist at over forty universities in the United Kingdom during LGBTQ and Black History month to discuss issues related to race, sexual orientation, and gender. Their work has been featured in Duckie, Bar Wotever, And What! Festival, Hamburg International Feminist Festival, Late at Tate, the V&A, and Transmission Gallery. They are currently the youngest person to be awarded a residency at The Tate in 2017/2018.

In 2016, Alabanza starred in the five star roundhouse production of Putting Words in Your Mouth by Scottee and became one of the 2016–2017 Artists in Residence at the Tate Britain. In 2017, they began working on a solo exhibition, The Other'd Artist for Transmission Gallery in Glasgow. Alabanza released their first chapbook titled Before I Step Outside. (You Love Me); a compilation of visual art, poetry, diary entries, and essays. They also performed the leading role in the stage adaptation of Derek Jarman's punk film Jubilee.

Alabanza has critiqued mainstream feminism for having been rooted in transphobia and mainstream feminists for often neglecting trans and gender non-conforming people in their discussions of progress.

In 2018, Alabanza started a new show called Burgerz. This show focuses on audience participation regarding an incident in 2016 where a person threw a burger at them while walking across a bridge in London. The show ran its UK Tour from October 19 to November 17 in 2018.

In 2019, Alabanza and Kaulbach, childhood friends, collaborated on an immersive installation titled All the Ways We Could Grow for the Free Word Centre, London. The installation explores the question, "What's it like to be trans?" while also provoking exploration into the calmness one experiences in their safe place, their bedroom. Disguised as a sleepover with pink satin sheets and pillows, the audience is encourage to take the space and imagine/reflect. The installation challenges the need for gender in society through works of imagery and poetry.

In 2020, during the first COVID lockdown in England, Alabanza and Danielle Brathwaite-Shirley gave a live-streamed performance for the Free Word Centre of If I Feel Lonely Maybe U Do 2?.

Overflow, written by Alabanza, directed by Debbie Hannan, and starring Reece Lyons, was produced by the Bush Theatre in London in 2020 and 2021. The play "explores trans safety and is set in a public toilet".

Personal life 
Alabanza was born in Bristol and grew up on a council estate.
They started making their art when they were 16 years old, helping them work through and process what adversities they were facing as a black, queer person. Alabanza began with their poems just as drafts on their phone, thinking they'd never show them to anyone else. After getting the burger thrown at them, they got fed up with keeping their feelings to themselves and presented their poems to their friend who was going through the same issues, which made Alabanza decide to make their works public.
Alabanza identifies as Black, transfeminine, and gender non-conforming, and uses the pronouns they/them. Alabanza speaks out for trans rights and the importance of safe spaces and communities for gender non-conforming and transgender people. In Shon Faye's 2021 book The Transgender Issue: An Argument for Justice, she quotes Alabanza talking about their identity: "When I say trans, I also mean escape. I mean choice. I mean autonomy. I mean wanting something greater than what you told me. Wanting more possibilities than the one you forced on me."

In November 2017, Alabanza was denied access to a female dressing room while shopping at Topshop in Manchester, the fashion retailer owned at the time by Sir Philip Green's Arcadia Group. Alabanza was told to use the men's dressing room. They left the store and filed a complaint through social media. Alabanza accused Topshop of going against their policy to allow trans individuals to use the dressing rooms associated with their preferred gender. The Times published an opinion piece by Janice Turner, incorrectly implying that Topshop's policy was changed because of Alabanza's tweet and claiming the policy would lead to child abuse. Subsequently, Alabanza received online death threats over Topshop's policy.

Works

References 

Living people
1996 births
21st-century English poets
Artists from Bristol
Black British actors
English performance artists
English spoken word artists
LGBT Black British people
English LGBT rights activists
English LGBT writers
Non-binary writers
Queer feminists
Queer writers
Transfeminists
Writers from Bristol
Non-binary artists
Non-binary activists